Agni Poolu may refer to:

 Agni Poolu, a novel by Yaddanapudi Sulochana Rani
 Agni Poolu (film)
 Agni Poolu (TV series)

See also

 Agni (disambiguation)
 Pulu (disambiguation)